Jonesboro High School may refer to:

Jonesboro High School (Arkansas) – Jonesboro, Arkansas
Jonesboro High School (Georgia) – Jonesboro, Georgia
Jonesboro Area Technical Center – Jonesboro, Arkansas
Jonesboro-Hodge High School – Jonesboro, Louisiana
Jonesboro School – Jonesboro, Texas